Święta Katarzyna ("Saint Catherine") may refer to the following places in Poland:
Święta Katarzyna, Lower Silesian Voivodeship (south-west Poland)
Święta Katarzyna, Świętokrzyskie Voivodeship (south-central Poland)

See also
 St. Catherine (disambiguation)